The 6th edition of Arab Champions League, The 2008–2009 is going to play as a knockout stage from 35 clubs, The Algerian club ES Sétif entered automatically as 2007–08 champion.

Format
 Each federation enter with (1~2) teams from their top Leagues
 – The teams must be one of the top 5 teams in the latest season, or Cup Champions/Runners-up.

 The Number of teams of each federation enters based on the previous editions results of the Arab Champions League
  The official sponsor ART can choose the rest teams to complete the 32 teams, so it may can reach 3 teams from one country
 – It's not necessary to be one of the top 5 teams.

 The Algerian club ES Sétif entered automatically as 2007–08 champion.

Participated teams
 35 clubs will be competing from the following countries.

Asia

Africa

The System
 The Qualifying: Knock out stage
 Round 32: Knock out stage
 Round 16: Knock out stage
 Round 8: Knock out stage
 Semifinals and final: Knock out stage

The Awards
 The Champions: 1,000,000 $
 The Runner-up: 650,000 $
 Round 4: 200,000 $
 Round 8: 100,000 $
 Round 16: 40,000 $
 Round 32: 20,000 $
 Qualifying: 5,000 $

The qualifying Stage
 4 teams play 1 leg match as Knock out stage.
 1 team qualify to the next stage (Round 32).

Round 32
32 teams play home and away matches as Knock out stage.

|}

 1 The Kuwaiti clubs' matches canceled due to FIFA's freezing of the membership of the Kuwait Football Association.
 2  Al-Shaab withdrew.

Round 32 Matches Dates
 The first legs on 28  and 29 October 2008
 The second legs on 25  and 26 November 2008

Round 16
16 teams play home and away matches as Knock out stage.

Qualified teams

  ES Sétif
  USM Alger
  Ismaily
  Al-Quwa Al-Jawiya
  Al-Faisaly
  Al-Wahdat
  Raja Casablanca
  Wydad Casablanca
  Al-Hazm
  Al-Hilal Club (Omdurman)
  Al-Merrikh
  Al-Ittihad Aleppo
  Espérance Sportive de Tunis
  CS Sfaxien
  US Monastir
  Al-Hilal Al-Sahili

Round 16 Matches

|}

 1  Al-Hilal Omdurman withdrew.

Round 16 Matches Dates
 The first legs on 16 December 2008
 The second legs on 26 December 2008

Quarter-finals
8 teams play home and away matches as Knock out stage.

Qualified teams

  ES Sétif
  Ismaily
  Al-Faisaly
  Al-Wahdat
  Wydad Casablanca
  CS Sfaxien
  Espérance Sportive de Tunis
  US Monastir

Quarter-finals Matches

|}

Quarter-final Match Dates
 The first legs between 1 March 2009 and 4 March 2009
 The second legs between 19 March 2009 and 21 March −2009

Semi-finals
4 teams play home and away matches as Knock out stage.

Semi-finals Matches

|}

First Legs

Second Legs

Final

First leg

Second leg

|}

Champions

Top scorers

Source: Goalzz.com

References

External links
Arab Champions' League 2008/09 rsssf.com
Official website

Arab Champions League, 2006–07
Arab Champions League, 2006–07
Arab Champions League, 2007–08
Arab Champions League, 2007–08
Arab Club Champions Cup